Mihai Popescu (born 15 March 1985 in Găești) is a Romanian handballer who plays for French team Saint-Raphaël Var Handball and the Romanian national team.

He was given the award of Cetățean de onoare ("Honorary Citizen") of his hometown Găești in 2009.

Achievements
LNH Division 1:
Runner-up: 2016
Liga Națională:
Winner: 2004, 2006, 2007, 2009, 2010, 2011, 2012, 2013, 2014
Cupa României:
Winner: 2006, 2011, 2012, 2013, 2014
Supercupa României:
Winners: 2008, 2011, 2013, 2014 
EHF Cup Winners' Cup:
Semifinalist: 2006 
EHF Cup:
Finalist: 2018
Semifinalist: 2014
EHF Challenge Cup:
Semifinalist: 2004

Individual awards
 Romanian Handballer of the Year: 2010, 2011, 2012, 2014, 2016, 2017, 2018, 2019,2020
 LNH Division 1 Best Foreign Goalkeeper: 2015–16
Best Goalkeeper of the EHF Cup's Final 4: 2018

References

1985 births
Living people
People from Găești
Romanian male handball players
HC Dobrogea Sud Constanța players
Expatriate handball players
Romanian expatriates in France